Riccus or Ricco was the Archbishop of Cagliari in the early thirteenth century.

In 1206, he requested the right to resign from Pope Innocent III, who simply enumerated the justifications for archiepiscopal resignation and left the decision up to Riccus. The following year (1207), he approved of the marriage (incestuous by canon law) of Hugh I of Arborea and a daughter of William I of Cagliari. He also did not intervene on the pope's behalf when Elena of Gallura, a ward of the pope, wed Lamberto di Eldizio without papal consent. For this, he received a stiff reprimand from Innocent.

Notes

Sources
Pennington, Kenneth. Popes and Bishops: The Papal Monarchy in the Twelfth and Thirteenth Centuries. Philadelphia, 1984.
Moore, John C. "Pope Innocent III, Sardinia, and the Papal State." Speculum, Vol. 62, No. 1. (Jan., 1987), pp 81–101.

12th-century births
13th-century deaths
People from Cagliari
Sardinian Roman Catholic priests
13th-century Roman Catholic archbishops in Sicily